is a Japanese professional shogi player ranked 4-dan.

Promotion history
The promotion history for Taniai is as follows.
6-kyū: September 2006
3-dan: October 2011
4-dan: April 1 2020

References

External links
 ShogiHub: Professional Player Info · Taniai, Hiroki

Living people
1994 births
Japanese shogi players
Professional shogi players
People from Chūō, Tokyo
Professional shogi players from Tokyo Metropolis
University of Tokyo alumni